This is a comprehensive listing of all official releases by Taxiride, an Australian rock band. Taxiride has released four studio albums and eleven singles.

Albums

Singles

References

External links 

 Taxiride homepage

 
Discographies of Australian artists
Rock music group discographies